731 Sorga (prov. designation:  or ) is a highly elongated background asteroid from the outer regions of the asteroid belt, approximately  in diameter. It was discovered on 15 April 1912, by German astronomer Adam Massinger at the Heidelberg-Königstuhl State Observatory in southwest Germany. The C-type (CD) and X-type asteroid (Xe) has a rotation period of 8.2 hours. It was named Sorga, meaning "the heavens" in the Indonesian language.

Orbit and classification 

Sorga is a non-family asteroid of the main belt's background population when applying the hierarchical clustering method to its proper orbital elements. It orbits the Sun in the outer asteroid belt at a distance of 2.6–3.4 AU once every 5 years and 2 months (1,886 days; semi-major axis of 2.99 AU). Its orbit has an eccentricity of 0.14 and an inclination of 11° with respect to the ecliptic. The body's observation arc begins at Heidelberg Observatory on 21 October 1919, more than seven years after its official discovery observation.

Naming 

This minor planet was named Sorga, the word for "the heavens" in the Indonesian language, also transliterated as "surga". The  was not mentioned in The Names of the Minor Planets by Paul Herget.

Physical characteristics 

In the Tholen classification, Sorga is closest to a common, carbonaceous C-type asteroid and somewhat similar to a dark D-type asteroid (CD), while in the Bus–Binzel SMASS classification, it is an Xe-subtype which transitions from the X-type to the bright E-type. Sorga has also been classified as a metallic M-type asteroid.

Rotation period and poles 

In April 2005, a rotational lightcurve of Sorga was obtained from photometric observations by Brian Warner at his Palmer Divide Observatory  in Colorado. Analysis gave a classically shaped bimodal lightcurve with a well-defined rotation period of  hours and a high brightness variation of  magnitude, indicative of its elongated shape. In February 2009, Warner revisited Sorga and determined a very similar period of  hours though with a much lower amplitude of  magnitude.

In January 2010, astronomers at the Palomar Transient Factory measured a period of  hours with an amplitude of  magnitude.

In 2016, a modeled lightcurve rendered a concurring sidereal period of  hours using data from the Uppsala Asteroid Photometric Catalogue, the Palomar Transient Factory survey, and individual observers, as well as sparse-in-time photometry from the NOFS, the Catalina Sky Survey, and the La Palma surveys . The study also determined two spin axes of (83.0°, 40.0°) and (275.0°, 21.0°) in ecliptic coordinates (λ, β).

Diameter and albedo 

The Collaborative Asteroid Lightcurve Link derives an albedo of 0.1339 and a diameter of 41.70 kilometers based on an absolute magnitude of 9.7.

These timed observations are taken when the asteroid passes in front of a distant star.

Notes

References

External links 
 Lightcurve Database Query (LCDB), at www.minorplanet.info
 Dictionary of Minor Planet Names, Google books
 Asteroids and comets rotation curves, CdR – Geneva Observatory, Raoul Behrend
 Discovery Circumstances: Numbered Minor Planets (1)-(5000) – Minor Planet Center
 
 

000731
Discoveries by Adam Massinger
Named minor planets
000731
000731
19120415